Agnes is a female given name derived from the Greek   , meaning 'pure' or 'holy'. The name passed to Italian as Agnese, to French as Agnès, to Portuguese as Inês, and to Spanish as Inés. It is also written as Agness. The name is descended from the Proto-Indo-European *h₁yaǵ-, meaning 'to sacrifice; to worship,' from which is also the Vedic term yajña. It is mostly used in Greece and countries that speak Germanic languages.

It was the name of a popular Christian saint, Agnes of Rome, which encouraged its wide use. Agnes was the third most popular name for women in the English speaking world for more than 400 years. Its medieval pronunciation was Annis, and its usage and many of its forms coincided with the equally popular name Anna, related in medieval and Elizabethan times to Agnes, though Anne/Ann/Anna are derived from the Hebrew Hannah ('God favored me') rather than the Greek. It remained a widely used name throughout the 1960s in the United States. It was last ranked among the top 1,000 names for American baby girls during that decade. 

The peak of its popularity was between 1900 and 1920, when it was among the top fifty given names for American girls. Agnieszka was the sixth-most popular name for girls born in Poland in 2007, having risen as high as third place in Sweden and Poland in 2006. It was also ranked among the top one hundred names for baby girls born in Hungary in 2005. Neža, a Slovene shortened variant of the name, was ranked among the top ten names for baby girls born in Slovenia in 2008. French forms Inès and Ines were both ranked among the top ten names for girls born in Brussels, Belgium in 2008.

Name variants
Agnė, Ugnė (mean: fire)(Lithuanian)
Ágnes (Hungarian)
Agneeta (Finnish)
Agnes (Danish, Dutch, English, Estonian, German, Icelandic, Norwegian, Swedish)
Agni (Sanskrit)
Anežka (Czech)
Agnès (French, Catalan)
Agnés (Valencian)
Агнеса (Agnesa) (Macedonian)
Agnese (Italian, Latvian)
Agnessa (Russian)
Agneta (Catalan, Danish, Icelandic, Norwegian, Swedish)
Agnete (Danish, Norwegian)
Agnetha (Scandinavian)
Agnethe (Danish, Norwegian)
Agneza (Croatian)
अग्नि (Agní) (Sanskrit)
Αγνή (Agni) (Greek)
Agnieszka (Polish)
Агнија (Agnija) (Macedonian)
Agniya (Russian)
Aignéis (Irish)
Akanete (Tongan)
Akanisi (Fijian)
Akenehi (Māori)
Akneeta (Finnish)
Akneetta (Finnish)
Aknes (Finnish)
Aknietta (Finnish)
Anê (Vietnamese)
Anessa (English)
Anissa (English)
Angnes (Dutch)
Anjeza (Albanian)
Annest (Welsh)
Annice (English)
Aune (Estonian, Finnish)
Iines (Finnish)
إيناس (Inās) (Arabic)
Ines (French, German, Italian)
Inès (French)
Inés (Spanish)
Inês (Portuguese)
Inesa (Lithuanian)
Inessa (Инесса) (Russian)
Inez (English)
Agnieszka (Polish)
Janja (Croatian, Slovenian)
Nesta (Welsh)
Nessie (Gaelic)
Neža (Slovenian)
Nieske (Dutch)
Oanez (Breton)
Огняна (Ognyana) (Bulgarian)

 Anjeza, Anja, Anushi, Anija (3 Tetor) (Albanian)

Notable people

Saints
 Agnes of Assisi (1197/98–1253), one of the first abbesses of the Order of Poor Ladies
 Agnes of Bohemia (1211–1282), Bohemian princess (also listed in next section)
 Agnes of Montepulciano (1263–1317), Dominican prioress
 Agnes of Rome (c. 291–c. 304), virgin martyr

Noblewomen
 Agnes I, Abbess of Quedlinburg (c. 1090-1125),  Princess-Abbess of Quedlinburg
 Agnes of Aquitaine (disambiguation)
 Agnes of Antioch, (1154–c. 1184), Queen consort of Hungary
 Agnes of Austria (disambiguation) 
 Agnes of Babenberg (c. 1108/13–1163), High Duchess of Poland and Duchess of Silesia
 Agnes of Bohemia (1211-1282), Bohemian princess and saint (see above)
 Agnes of Brandenburg (c. 1257–1304), Queen consort and regent of Denmark
 Agnes of Burgundy, Duchess of Aquitaine (died 1068)
 Agnes of Burgundy, Duchess of Bourbon (1407-1476)
 Agnes of Courtenay (c. 1136–c. 1184), Queen consort of Jerusalem
 Agnes of France, Byzantine Empress (1171–after 1207)
 Agnes of France, Duchess of Burgundy (c. 1260–1327)
 Agnes of Germany (1072-1143), Duchess consort of Swabia by her first marriage, Margravine consort of Austria by her second
 Agnes of Habsburg (c. 1257–1322), Duchess of Saxony
Agnes Hammarskjöld (1866–1940), wife of Swedish noble Hjalmar Hammarskjöld
 Princess Agnes of Hohenlohe-Langenburg (1804-1833)
 Agnes of Hohenstaufen (1176–1204), Countess Palatine of the Rhine
 Agnes Hotot (14th century), English noblewoman known for winning a lance fight
 Agnes of Merania (died 1201), Queen of France
 Agnes of the Palatinate (1201–1267), Duchess of Bavaria 
 Agnes of Poitou (1025-1077), Holy Roman Empress and regent
 Agnes of Rochlitz (died 1195), Duchess of Merania and Countess of Andechs
Agnès Sorel (died 1450), mistress of Charles VII of France, and the first officially recognized mistress of a French king
 Agnes, daughter of Ottokar II (before 1260–after 1279), Bohemian noblewoman
 Mihrişah Valide Sultan or Sultana Mehr-î-Shah (ca. 1745–1805), spouse of Ottoman Sultan Mustafa III, mother of Caliph Sultan Selim III,  believed to have the given name Agnès
 Agnes Howard, Duchess of Norfolk (c. 1477–1545)
 Agnes Macdonald, 1st Baroness Macdonald of Earnscliffe (1836-1920), second wife of Sir John A. Macdonald, the first Prime Minister of Canada
 Agnes Randolph (c. 1312–1369), Countess of Dunbar and March

Others

Agnes

A–E
 Agnes Aanonsen (born 1966), Norwegian luger
 Agnes Dean Abbatt (1847–1917), American painter
 Agnes Abuom, Kenyan Christian organizational worker
 Agnes Acibu, Ugandan politician
 Agnes Jones Adams (1858–1923), American civil rights activist
 Agnes Addison (1842–1903), New Zealand draper
 Agnes Adler (1865–1935), Danish pianist
 Agnes Aduako (born 1989), Ghanaian footballer
 Agnes Aggrey-Orleans, Ghanaian diplomat
 Agnes Akiror (born 1968), Ugandan politician
 Agnes Baldwin Alexander (1875–1971), American author
 Agnes Alexiusson (born 1996), Swedish boxer
 Agnes Alfred (c. 1890–1992), Canadian storyteller and noblewoman
 Agnes Allafi (born 1959), Chadian politician and sociologist
 Agnes Allen (1898–1958), English children's book author
 Agnes Allen (1930–2012), American baseball pitcher
 Agnes Alpers (born 1961), German politician and educator
 Agnes Ameede (born 1970), Ugandan politician
 Agnes Atim Apea, Uganda social entrepreneur
 Agnes Arber (1879–1960), British plant morphologist and anatomist, historian, and philosopher
 Agnes Arellano (born 1949), Philippine sculptor
 Agnes Armstrong (born 1959), Cook Islands politician
 Agnes Arvidsson (1875–1962), Swedish pharmacist
 Agnes Asche (1891–1966), German socialist
 Agnes Ashford (fl. 15th century), Christian evangelist
 Agnes Barr Auchencloss (1886–1972), medical officer at H.M. Factory Gretna, on the University of Glasgow Roll of Honour
 Agnes Awuor (born 1967), Kenyan Religious Sister
 Agnes Ayres (1898–1940), American silent film star
 Agnes Baden-Powell (1858–1945), British pioneer, founder of the Girl Guides movement
 Agnes Bakkevig (1910–1992), Norwegian politician
 Agnes Baliques (1641–1700), Roman Catholic religious leader
 Agnes Ballard (1877–1969), American architect and educator
 Agnes Baltsa (born 1944), Greek mezzo-soprano singer
 Agnes Barker (1907–2008), Australian potter and craftworker
 Agnes Jeruto Barsosio (born 1983), Kenyan long-distance runner
 Agnes Sime Baxter (1870–1917), Canadian mathematician
 Agnes Beaumont (c. 1652–1720), English religious autobiographer
 Agnes Beckwith (1861–1951), English swimmer
 Agnes Benidickson (1920–2007), Canadian college chancellor
 Agnes Bennett (1872–1960), New Zealand doctor and Chief Medical Officer in World War I
 Agnes Benítez (born 1986), Puerto Rican beauty pageant titleholder
 Agnes Berger (1916–2002), Hungarian-American mathematician and professor
 Agnes Bernard (1842–1932), Roman Catholic nun
 Agnes Bernauer (1410–1435), morganatic wife of Albert III, Duke of Bavaria
 Agnes Bernelle (1923–1999), Berlin actress and singer
 Agnes Binagwaho, Rwandan pediatrician and college chancellor
 Agnes Forbes Blackadder (1875 - 1964), Scottish medic
 Agnes Blackie (1897–1975), New Zealand professor
 Agnes Blannbekin (c. 1244–1315), Austrian Beguine and Chrisian mystic
 Agnes Block (1629–1704), Dutch art collector and horticulturalist
 Agnes Bluhm (1862–1943), German medical doctor and Goethe medal recipient
 Agnes Body (1866–1952), British headmistress
 Agnes Bolsø (born 1953), Norwegian sociologist
 Agnes Booth (1843–1910), Australian-American actress
 Agnes Börjesson (1827–1900), Swedish painter
 Agnes Borrowman (1881–1955), Scottish pharmaceutical chemist
 Agnes Boulton (1893–1968), British-American pulp magazine writer
 Agnes Rose Bouvier Nicholl (1842–1892), English artist
 Agnes Bowker (born c. 1541, death date unknown), English domestic servant and alleged mother of a cat
 Agnes Branting (1862–1930), Swedish textile artist and writer
 Agnes M. Brazal, Filipina theologian
 Agnes Baldwin Brett (1876–1955), American numismatist and archaeologist
 Agnes Broun (1732–1820), mother of Scotland's national poet, Robert Burns
 Agnes Brown (1866–1943), Scottish suffragist and writer
 Agnes Bruckner, American actress and model
 Agnes Bugge (born before 1417 and died after 1430), English brewer
 Agnes Bulmer (1775–1836), English poet
 Agnes Buntine (c. 1822–1896), Scottish pastoralist and bullocky
 Agnes Burns (1762–1834), sister of Scotland's national poet, Robert Burns
 Agnes Busby (1800–1889), New Zealand pioneer
 Agnes Bushell (born 1949), American writer and teacher
 Agnes Callard (born 1976), Hungarian professor
 Agnes Kane Callum (1925–2015), American genealogist
 Agnes Deans Cameron (1863–1912), Canadian educator, writer, journalist, lecturer, and adventurer
 Agnes Campbell (1637–1716), Scottish businesswoman
 Agnes Canta (1888–1964), Dutch painter
 Agnes Carlsson, Swedish pop star, better known by the mononym Agnes
 Agnes Castle (1860–1922), Irish author
 Agnes Catlow (1806–1889), British writer
 Agnes Chan (born 1955), Hong Kong-based singer, television personality, professor, essayist, and novelist
 Agnes Chan Tsz-ching (born 1996), Hong Kong rugby union player
 Agnes Charbonneau, American politician and educator
 Agnes Chavez, Cuban-American artist, educator, and social entrepreneur
 Agnes Asangalisa Chigabatia (born 1956), Ghanaian politician
 Agnes Chow (born 1996), Hong Kong-based politician and democratic activist
 Agnes Muriel Clay (1878–1962), English historian and writer
 Agnes Morley Cleaveland (1874–1958), American writer and cattle rancher
 Agnes Mary Clerke (1842–1907), Irish astronomer and writer
 Agnes Bell Collier (1860–1930), British mathematician 
 Agnes Kalaniho'okaha Cope (1924–2015), Hawaiian historian and spiritual healer 
 Agnes Conway (1885–1950), British writer, historian, and archaeologist 
 Agnes Cotton (1828–1899), English social reformer and philanthropist 
 Agnes Marshall Cowan (1880–1940), Scottish physician 
 Agnes Curran (1920–2005), British prison governor 
 Agnes d'Harcourt (died 1291), French author 
 Agnes Dahlström (born 1991), Swedish footballer 
 Agnes Davies (1920–2011), Welsh snooker and billiards player 
 Agnes Dawson (1873–1953), British politician and trade unionist 
 Agnes de Frumerie (1869–1937), Swedish artist 
 Agnes de Lima (1887–1974), American journalist and writer 
 Agnes de Mille (1905–1993), American dancer and choreographer
 Agnes De Nul (born 1955), Belgian actress
 Agnes de Selincourt (1872–1917), Indian Christian missionary
 Agnes de Silva (1895–1961), Sri Lankan woman's activist
 Agnes de Valence (born 1250), French noblewoman
 Agnes Mariam de la Croix (born 1952), Lebanese Christian nun, known as Mother Agnes
 Agnes Denes (born 1931), Hungarian-American artist
 Agnes Dennis (1859–1947), Canadian educator and feminist
 Agnes Devanadera (born 1950), Filipina lawyer and politician
 Agnes Digital (1997–2021), American-Japanese Thoroughbred racehorse
 Agnes Dobronski (1925–2013), American politician and educator
 Agnes Dollan (1887–1966), Scottish suffragette and political activist
 Agnes Dordzie, Ghanaian judge
 Agnes Meyer Driscoll (1889–1971), American cryptanalyst
 Agnes Mary Frances Duclaux (1857–1944), English poet, novelist, essayist, literary critic, and translator
 Agnes Dunbar (fl. late 14th century), Scottish mistress
 Agnes Duncan (1899–1996), Scottish singer and conductor
 Agnes Dürer (1475–1539), wife of the Roman painter, Albrecht Dürer
 Agnes Dusart (born 1962), Belgian racing cyclist
 Agnes Edwards (c. 1873–1928), Australian craftswoman
 Agnes Ell (1917–2003), New Zealand cricketer
 Agnes Ethel (1846–1903), American stage actress
 Agnes Gardner Eyre (1881–1950), American pianist, composer, and piano teacher

F–M 
 Agnes Fabish (1873–1947), New Zealand domestic servant, farmer, and homemaker
 Agnes Mary Field (1896–1968), English film producer and director
 Agnes Fingerin (d. 1514), German businesswoman
 Agnes Finnie (died 1645), Scottish shopkeeper, moneylender, and tried witch
 Agnes Fleischer (1865–1909), Norwegian pioneering teacher for disabled persons
 Agnes Flight (born 1997), Japanese Thoroughbred racehorse
 Agnes Flora (1987–2005), Japanese bay racehorse
 Agnes Fogo, American renal pathologist and professor
 Agnes Fong Sock Har (born 1946), Singaporean military officer
 Agnes Freda Forres (1881–1942), British artist and sculptor
 Agnes Forster (died 1484), English prison reformer
 Agnes Franz (1794–1843), German writer
 Agnes Fraser (1876–1968), Scottish stage actress and soprano singer
 Agnes Freund (1866– after 1902), German stage actress
 Agnes Fry (1869–1958), British bryologist, astronomer, botanical illustrator, writer, and poet
 Agnes Moore Fryberger (1868-1939), American music educator
 Agnes Buen Garnås (born 1946), Norwegian folk singer
 Agnes Garrett (1845–1935), English suffragist and interior designer
 Agnes Gavin (1872–1947), Australian silent film actor and screenwriter
 Agnes Geene (born 1947), Dutch badminton player
 Agnes Geijer (1898–1989), Swedish textile historian and archaeologist
 Agnes Geraghty (1907–1974), American swimmer
 Agnes Giberne (1845–1939), British novelist and scientific writer
 Agnes Giebel (1921–2017), German classical soprano
 Agnes Goode (1872–1947), Australian social and political activist, best known as Mrs. A. K. Goode
 Agnes Goodsir (1864–1939), Australian painter
 Agnes Gordon (1906–1967), Canadian bridge player
 Agnes Griffith (1969–2015), Grenadian sprinter
 Agnes Charlotte Gude (1863–1929), Norwegian watercolorist and illustrator
 Agnes Gund (born 1938), American philanthropist and art collector
 Agnes Günther (1863–1911), German writer
 Agnes Guppy-Volckman (1838–1917), British spiritualist medium
 Agnes Haakonsdatter (1290–1319), eldest daughter of King Haakkon V of Norway
 Agnes C. Hall (1777–1846), Scottish writer
 Agnes Hamilton (1868–1961), American social worker
 Agnes Sillars Hamilton (c. 1794–1870), Scottish reformer, public lecturer, phrenologist, and woman's rights activist
 Agnes Hammarskjöld (1866–1940), wife of Swedish nobleman and prime minister, Hjalmar Hammarskjöld
 Agnes Hamvas (born 1946), Hungarian archer
 Agnes Harben (1879–1961), British suffragist leader
 Agnes Hardie (1874–1951), British politician
 Agnes Ellen Harris (1883–1952), American educator
 Agnes Harrold (c. 1831–1903), New Zealand hotel manager, foster parent, nurse, and midwife
 Agnes Headlam-Morley (1902–1986), British historian and academic
 Agnes Hedengård (born 1995), Swedish model and reality television participant
 Agnes Heineken (1872–1954), German politician
 Agnes Henningsen (1868–1962), Danish writer and activist
 Agnes Herbert (late 1870s–1960), British writer and big game hunter
 Agnes M. Herzberg, Canadian statistician and professor
 Agnes Hewes (1874–1963), American children's author
 Agnes C. Higgins (1911–1985), Canadian nutritionist
 Agnes Hijman (born 1966), Dutch long-distance runner
 Agnes Leonard Hill (1842–1917), American journalist, author, poet, newspaper founder/publisher, evangelist, social reformer
 Agnes Hiorth (1899–1984), Norwegian painter
 Agnes Hotot (fl. 1395), English noblewoman
 Agnes Hsu-Tang (born 1972), American archaeologist, art historian, and philanthropist
 Agnes Twiston Hughes (1895–1981), Welsh solicitor and politician
 Agnes Hundoegger (1858–1927), German musician and music teacher
 Agnes Hungerford (died 1523), English murderer
 Agnes Hunt (1866–1948), British nurse
 Agnes Huntington (ca. 1864–1953), American operatic singer
 Agnes Hürland-Büning (1926–2009), German politician
 Agnes Husband (1852–1929), Scottish politician: one of Dundee's first female councillors and suffragette
 Agnes Husslein (born 1954), Austrian art historian and art manager
 Agnes Ibbetson (1757–1823), English plant physiologist
 Agnes Igoye (born 1972), Ugandan social worker and campaigner against human trafficking
 Agnes Inglis (1870–1952), American anarchist and architect
 Agnes Irwin (1841–1914), American educator
 Agnes Israelson (1896–1989), American politician
 Agnes E. Jacomb (1866–1949), English novelist
 Agnes Janich (born 1985), Polish visual artist
 Agnes Janson (1861–1947), Swedish mezzo-soprano opera singer and recitalist
 Agnes Jekyll (1861–1937), Scottish-British artist, writer, and philanthropist
 Agnes Joaquim (1854–1899), Singaporean-Armenian botanist
 Agnes Christine Johnston (1896–1978), American screenwriter
 Agnes Jones (1832–1868), Irish nurse
 Agnes Jongerius (born 1960), Dutch politician
 Agnes Jónsdóttir (died 1507), Icelandic Christian nun
 Agnes Jordan (before 1520–1546), English Roman Catholic abbess
 Agnes Kafula (born 1955), Namibian politician
 Agnes Kalibata, Rwandan agricultural scientist and policymaker
 Agnes Kant (born 1967), Dutch politician
 Agnes Kaposi (born 1932), British-Hungarian engineer and author
 Agnes Karll (1868–1927), German nurse and nursing reformer
 Agnes Kauzuu (born 1979), Namibian football goalkeeper
 Agnes Newton Keith (1901–1982), American writer
 Agnes Gilmour Kent-Johnston (1893–1981), New Zealand community leader and broadcaster
 Agnes Kemp (1823–1908), American physician
 Agnes Keyser (1852–1941), English humanitarian, courtesan, and mistress
 Agnes Kharshiing, Indian woman's rights activist
 Agnes King (1919–2003), U.S. Virgin Islander historic preservationist and gardener
 Agnes Kiprop (born 1980), Kenyan long-distance runner
 Agnes Kirabo, Ugandan politician and legislator
 Agnes Kittelsen (born 1980), Norwegian actress
 Agnes Knochenhauer (born 1989), Swedish curler
 Agnes Konde, Ugandan businesswoman and corporate executive
 Agnes Kripps (1925–2014), Canadian politician
 Agnes Krumwiede (born 1977), German pianist and politician
 Agnes Kunihira (born 1966), Ugandan politician
 Agnes Lam (born 1972), Macanese poet, educator, journalist, and politician
 Agnes Lange (1929–2021), German politician
 Agnes Larson (1892–1957), American historian
 Agnes Kwaje Lasuba (born 1948), South Sudanese politician
 Agnes Latham (1905–1996), British academic and professor
 Agnes D. Lattimer (1928–2018), American pediatrician
 Agnes Lauchlan (1905–1993), British stage, film, and television actress
 Agnes Christina Laut (1871–1936), Canadian journalist, novelist, historian, and social worker
 Agnes Le Louchier (1660–1717), French royal mistress and spy
 Agnes Brand Leahy (1893–1934), American screenwriter
 Agnes Lee (1868–1939), American poet and translator
 Agnes Limbo (born 1957), Namibian politician
 Agnes Littlejohn (1865–1944), Australian writer
 Agnes Locsin (born 1957), Filipino dance choreographer
 Agnes Loheni (born 1971), New Zealand politician
 Agnes Lum (born 1956), American model and singer
 Agnes Lundell (1878–1936), Finnish lawyer
 Agnes Lunn (1850–1941), Danish painter and sculptor
 Agnes Lyall (1908–2013), American artist
 Agnes Lyle (1700s–1800s), British ballad singer
 Agnes Lyon (1762–1840), Scottish poet
 Agnes Syme Macdonald (1882–1966), Scottish suffragette
 Agnes Macdonell (c. 1840–1925), British writer and journalist
 Agnes Maule Machar (1837–1927), Canadian author, poet, and social reformer
 Agnes Mure Mackenzie (1891–1955), Scottish historian and writer
 Agnes Maclehose (1758–1841), Scottish woman who had an affair with Scottish poet and lyricist, Robert Burns
 Agnes Maxwell MacLeod (1783–1879), Scottish poet
 Agnes Macphail (1890–1954), Canadian politician
 Agnes Macready (1855–1935), Australian nurse and journalist
 Agnes Magnell (1878–1966), Swedish architect
 Agnes Magnúsdóttir (1795–1830), last person to be executed in Iceland
 Agnes Magpale (born 1942), Filipina educator and politician
 Agnes Catherine Maitland (1850–1906), English academic
 Agnes Mary Mansour (1931–2004), American Catholic nun, politician, and public official
 Agnes Marshall (1855–1905), English culinary entrepreneur, inventor, and celebrity chef
 Agnes Bernice Martin (1912–2004), Canadian-American abstract painter
 Agnes Marwa (born 1978), Tanzanian politician
 Agnes Mason (1849–1941), British nun
 Agnes Katharina Maxsein (1904–1991), German politician
 Agnes McCullough (1888–1967), Irish teacher, philanthropist, and activist
 Agnes McDonald (1829–1906), New Zealand settler, nurse, postmistress, and teacher
 Agnes McLaren (1837–1913), Scottish doctor
 Agnes McLean (1918–1994), Scottish trade unionist and politician
 Agnes McWhinney (1891–1987), Australian solicitor
 Agnes Mellers (died 1513/1514), English co-founder of Nottingham High School
 Agnes E. Meyer (1887–1970), American journalist, philanthropist, civil rights activist, and art patron
 Agnes Meyer-Brandis (born 1973), German artist
 Agnes Kirsopp Lake Michels (1909–1993), American scholar
 Agnes Miegel (1879–1964), German author, journalist, and poet
 Agnes Milne (1851–1919), Australian suffragist
 Agnes Milowka (1981–2011), Australian technical driver, underwater photographer, author, maritime archaeologist, and cave explorer
 Agnes Woods Mitchell (1802–1844), Scottish-American writer and schoolteacher
 Agnes Mizere, Malawian TV personality, journalist, and blogger
 Agnez Mo (born 1986), Indonesian pop star
 Agnes Mongan (1905–1996), American art historian and curator
 Agnes Marion Moodie (1881–1969), Scottish chemist
 Agnes Dunbar Moodie Fitzgibbon (1833–1913), Canadian artist
 Agnes Claypole Moody (1870–1954), American zoologist and professor
 Agnes Moore (born 1979), American entertainer who performs as Peppermint (drag queen)
 Agnes Moorehead (1900–1974), American actress
 Agnes Morgan (1879–1976), American director, playwright, actress, and theatrical producer
 Agnes Fay Morgan (1884–1968), American chemist and academic
 Agnes Thomas Morris (1865–1949), American writer and clubwoman
 Agnes Morrison (1867–1934), Scottish charity worker
 Agnes Morton (1872–1952), British tennis player
 Agnes Mowinckel (1875–1963), Norwegian actress and theatre director
 Agnes Mukabaranga, Rwandan politician
 Agnes Mulder (born 1973), Dutch politician
 Agnes Murgoci (1875–1929), Australian-English zoologist and folklorist
 Agnes G. Murphy (1865–1931), Irish journalist and writer
 Agnes Muthspiel (1914–1966), Austrian painter

N–Z
 Agnes Naa Momo Lartey (born 1976), Ghanaian politician
 Agnes Nalwanga (born 1975), Ugandan businesswoman, management professional, and corporate executive
 Agnes Namyalo (born c. 1975), Ugandan banker and corporate executive
 Agnes Nandutu, Ugandan journalist, politician, and Minister
 Agnes Nanogak (1925–2001), Canadian artist
 Agnes Nestor (1880–1948), American labor leader, politician, and social reformer
 Agnes Neuerer, Austrian luger
 Agnes Neuhaus (1854–1944), German social worker and politician
 Agnes Ng Siew Heok, or simply Agnes Ng, Singaporean murder victim of the Toa Payoh child murders in 1981 
 Agnes Nicholls (1876–1959), English soprano
 Agnes Nixon (1922–2016), American television writer and producer
 Agnes Nyalonje, Malawian politician
 Agnes Nyanhongo (born 1960), Zimbabwean sculptor
 Agnes Nyblin (1869–1945), Norwegian photographer
 Agnes Nygaard Haug (born 1933), Norwegian judge
 Agnes O'Casey (born 1995/1996), English actress
 Agnes O'Farrelly (1874–1951), Irish academic and professor
 Agnes Oaks (born 1970), Estonian ballerina
 Agnes Obel (born 1980), Danish indie folk singer-songwriter and pianist
 Agnes Odhiambo, Kenyan accountant, financial manager, and civil servant
 Agnes Odhiambo, Kenyan female human rights activist
 Agnes Okoh (1905–1995), Nigerian Christian evangelist
 Agnes Osazuwa (born 1989), Nigerian track and field sprinter
 Agnes Elisabeth Overbeck (1870–1919), Anglo-Russian composer and pianist
 Agnes Owens (1926–2014), Scottish author
 Agnes Ozman (1870–1937), American evangelical
 Agnes Pardaens (born 1956), Belgian long-distance runner
 Agnes Pareyio (born 1956), Kenyan woman's rights activist, politician, and businesswoman
 Agnes Miller Parker (1895–1980), Scottish engraver, illustrator, and painter
 Agnes Parsons (1884–1970), American screenwriter
 Agnes Lawrence Pelton (1881–1961), German painter
 Agnes Penemulungu, Malawian politician
 Agnes Pihlava (born 1980), Polish musician
 Agnes Baker Pilgrim (1924–2019), Native American spiritual elder
 Agnes Plum (1869–1951), German politician
 Agnes Pochin (1825–1908), British woman's rights activist
 Agnes Pockels (1862–1935), German chemist
 Agnes Blake Poor (1842–1922), American author and translator, known professionally as Dorothy Prescott
 Agnes Porter (c. 1752–1814), British governess
 Agnes Potten (died 1556), English prisoner who was burned at the stake
 Agnes Prest (died 1557), Cornish Protestant martyr
 Agnes Quaye (born 1989), Ghanaian footballer
 Agnes J. Quirk (1884–1974), American bacteriologist, plant pathologist, and inventor
 Agnes Quisumbing, Filipino economist and academic
 Agnes Raeburn (1872–1955), Scottish artist
 Agnes Ramsey (died 1399), English businesswoman
 Agnes Ravatn (born 1983), Norwegian novelist, columnist, and journalist
 Agnes Regan (1869–1943), American Roman Catholic social reformer
 Agnes Rehni (1887–1966), Danish stage and film actress
 Agnes Reisch (born 1999), German ski jumper
 Agnes Repplier (1855–1950), American essayist
 Agnes Reston (1771–1856), Scottish wartime nurse, also known as the Heroine of Matagorda
 Agnes Kay Eppers Reynders (born 1971), Bolivian road cyclist
 Agnes Richards (1883–1967), American psychiatric nurse
 Agnes Millen Richmond (1870–1964), American painter
 Agnes Richter (1844–1918), German seamstress
 Agnes Ludwig Riddle (1865–1930), American politician
 Agnes Jane Robertson (1893–1959), English historian
 Agnes Kelly Robertson (1833–1916), Scottish-American stage actress
 Agnes Robertson Robertson (1882–1968), Australian schoolteacher, community worker, and politician
 Agnes L. Rogers (1884–1943), Scottish educator and psychologist
 Agnes Romilly White (1872–1945), Irish novelist
 Agnes Rose-Soley (1847–1938), Scottish-Australian journalist and poet
 Agnes Rossi (born 1959), American fiction writer
 Agnes Rothery (1888–1954), American writer
 Agnes Ryan (1878–1954), American pacifist, vegetarian, suffragist, and journal editor
 Agnes Salm-Salm (1844–1912), American wife of Prince Felix zu Salm-Salm
 Agnes Sam (born 1942), South African writer
 Agnes Samaria (born 1972), Namibian middle-distance runner
 Agnes Sampson (died 1591), Scottish purported witch
 Agnes Samuelson (1887–1963), American educator and school superintendent
 Agnes Sander-Plump (1888–1980), German painter
 Agnes Sandström (1887–1985), Swedish Titanic survivor
 Agnes Sanford (1897–1982), American writer
 Agnes Yewande Savage (1906–1964), Nigerian medical doctor and physician
 Agnes Scanlon (1923–2018), American politician
 Agnes Schierhuber (born 1946), Austrian politician
 Agnes Schmidt (1875–1952), German activist and politician
 Agnes M. Sigurðardóttir (born 1954), Icelandic prelate
 Agnes Simon (1935–2020), Hungarian table tennis player
 Agnes Sjöberg (1888–1964), Finnish veterinarian
 Agnes Elizabeth Slack (1858–1946), English Temperance advocate
 Agnes Sligh Turnbull (1888–1982), American writer
 Agnes Slott-Møller (1862–1937), Danish painter
 Agnes Smedley (1892–1950), American journalist, writer, and activist
 Agnes Smidt (1874–1952), Danish painter
 Agnes Smith Lewis (1843–1926), Scottish travel writer alongside her twin sister, Margaret
 Agnes Smyth (c. 1755–1783), Irish Methodist preacher
 Agnes Sorma (1862–1927), German actress
 Agnes Stavenhagen (1860–1945), German operatic soprano
 Agnes Steele (1881–1949), American actress
 Agnes Steineger (1863–1965), Norwegian painter
 Agnes Stevenson (1873–1935), British chess player
 Agnes Grainger Stewart (1871–1956), Scottish writer
 Agnes L. Storrie (1864–1936), Australian poet and writer
 Agnes Straub (1890–1941), German film actress
 Agnes Street-Klindworth (1825–1906), illegitimate daughter of Danish journalist, actor, and diplomat, Georg Klindworth
 Agnes Strickland (1796–1874), English writer and poet
 Agnes Surriage Frankland (1726–1783), American tavern maid who married British baronet, Sir Charles Henry
 Agnes Syme Lister (1834–1893), Scottish botanist
 Agnes Taaka (born 1980), Ugandan politician, social worker, and legislator
 Agnes Tachyon (1998–2009), Japanese Thoroughbred racehorse
 Agnes Oforiwa Tagoe-Quarcoopome (1913–1997), Ghanaian activist
 Agnes Tait (1894–1981), American painter, artist, lithographer, muralist, and dancer
 Agnes Takea (died 1622), Japanese Roman Catholic martyr
 Agnes Clara Tatham (1893–1972), English painter
 Agnes Taubert (1844–1877), German writer and philosopher
 Agnes Taylor (1821–1911), English Mormon pioneer
 Agnes Reeves Taylor (born 1965), ex-wife of former Liberian President, Charles Taylor
 Agnes Terei, Vanuatuan educator and politician
 Agnes Le Thi Thanh, one of the Vietnamese Martyrs
 Agnes Thomas Morris (1865–1949), American writer and clubwoman
 Agnes Tibayeita Isharaza, Ugandan lawyer and corporate executive
Agnes Tirop (1995–2021), Kenyan long-distance runner
Agnes Tjongarero (born 1946), Namibian politician
Agnes Torres (born 1939), one of the first studied transgender women
Agnes Tsao Kou Ying (1821–1856), Chinese layperson
Agnes Tschetschulin (1859–1942), Finnish composer and violinist
Agnes Tschurtschenthaler (born 1982), Italian middle- and long-distance runner
Agnes Tuckey (1877–1972), English tennis player
Agnes TuiSamoa (1932–2004), New Zealand community organizer and social worker
Agnes Tyrrell (1846–1883), Czech composer and pianist
Agnes Ullmann (1927–2019), French microbiologist
Agnes van Ardenne (born 1950), Dutch politician and diplomat
Agnes van Stolk (1898–1980), Dutch artist
Agnes van den Bossche (c. 1435– c. 1504), Dutch painter
Agnes Vanderburg (1901–1989), Native American teacher, translator, and author
Agnes Gertrude VanKoughnet (1860–1940), Canadian socialite
Agnes Varis (1930–2011), American businesswoman and philanthropist
Agnes Vernon (1895–1948), American silent film actress
Agnes Nebo von Ballmoos (1938–2000), Liberian professor, conductor, composer, and lawyer
Agnes von Konow (1868–1944), Finnish animal rights advocate
 Agnes von Krusenstjerna (1894–1940), Swedish writer
 Agnes von Kurowsky (1892–1984), American nurse during World War I with whom Ernest Hemingway fell in love
 Agnes von Mansfeld-Eisleben (1551–1637), German countess
 Agnes von Rosen (1924–2001), Swedish aristocrat, bullfighter, and stunt performer
 Agnes von Zahn-Harnack (1884–1950), German teacher, writer, and woman's rights activist
 Agnes Walsh (born 1950), Canadian poet, playwright, actor, and storyteller
 Agnes Marion McLean Walsh (1884–1967), Australian nurse
 Agnes Warburg (1872–1953), British photographer
 Agnes Ward White (1857–1943), wife of Albert B. White, the former Governor of West Virginia
 Agnes Waterhouse (c. 1503–1566), English woman accused of witchcraft
 Agnes Waters (1893–1962), American politician and realtor
 Agnes Baldwin Webb (1926–2001), American basketball player
 Agnes Weinrich (1873–1946), American visual artist
 Agnes Welin (1844–1928), Swedish missionary
 Agnes E. Wells (1876–1959), American educator and women's equal rights activist
 Agnes Wenman (died 1617), English Roman Catholic translator
 Agnes Wergeland (1857–1914), Norwegian-American historian, poet, and educator
 Agnes Westbrook Morrison (1854–1939), American lawyer
 Agnes Weston (1840–1918), English philanthropist
 Agnes Weston (1879–1972), New Zealand politician
 Agnes Wheeler (bap. 1734–1804), British writer
 Agnes Burns Wieck (1892–1966), American labor activist and journalist
 Agnes Wieslander (1873–1934), Swedish painter
 Agnes Windeck (1888–1975), German theatre and film actress
 Agnes Wolbert (born 1958), Dutch politician
 Agnes Wold (born 1955), Swedish biologist and professor
 Agnes Wood (1921–2013), New Zealand artist and writer
 Agnes Woodward (1872–1938), American music educator and whistler
 Agnes World (1995–2012), American-bred Japanese Thoroughbred racehorse and sire
 Agnes Wright Spring (1894–1988), American journalist, writer, and historian
 Agnes Yombwe (born 1966), Zambian mixed media artist, arts educator, author, and mentor
 Agnes Zawadzki (born 1994), American figure skater
 Agnes Zimmermann (1847–1925), German pianist and composer
 Agnes Zurowski (1920–2013), American baseball pitcher

Ágnes
 Ágnes Babos (1944–2020), Hungarian handball player
 Ágnes Bartha (born 1922), Hungarian photographer
 Ágnes Bukta (born 1993), Hungarian tennis player
 Ágnes Bánfai (1947–2020), Hungarian gymnast
 Ágnes Bánfalvy (born 1954), Hungarian actress
 Ágnes Bíró (1917–2008), Hungarian swimmer
 Ágnes Csomor (born 1979), Hungarian actress
 Ágnes Dobó (born 1988), Hungarian model and beauty pageant titleholder
 Ágnes Dragos, Hungarian sprint canoer
 Ágnes Esterházy (1891–1956), Hungarian actress
 Ágnes Farkas (born 1973), Hungarian handball player
 Ágnes Ferencz (born 1956), Hungarian sport shooter
 Ágnes Fodor (born 1964), Hungarian swimmer
 Ágnes Gajdos-Hubai (1948–2014), Hungarian volleyball player
 Ágnes Gee (born 1974), Hungarian tennis player
 Ágnes Gergely (born 1933), Hungarian writer, educator, journalist, and translator
 Ágnes Gerlach (born 1968), Hungarian diver
 Ágnes Geréb (born 1952), Hungarian gynaecologist and psychologist 
 Ágnes Hankiss (1950–2021), Hungarian politician
 Ágnes Hegedűs, Hungarian orienteer
 Ágnes Heller (1929–2019), Hungarian philosopher and lecturer
 Ágnes Herczeg, Hungarian artist
 Ágnes Herczegh (born 1950), Hungarian discus thrower
 Ágnes Hornyák (born 1982), Hungarian handball player
 Ágnes Hranitzky, Hungarian film editor and director
 Ágnes Juhász-Balajcza (born 1952), Hungarian volleyball player
 Ágnes Kaczander (born 1953), Hungarian swimmer
 Ágnes Keleti (born 1921), Hungarian-Israeli Olympic champion artistic gymnast
 Ágnes Konkoly (born 1987), Hungarian model, wedding planner, and beauty pageant titleholder
 Ágnes Kovács (born 1981), Hungarian swimmer
 Ágnes Kozáry (born 1966), Hungarian sprinter
 Ágnes Kunhalmi (born 1982), Hungarian politician
 Ágnes Lehóczky (born 1976), Hungarian poet, academic, and translator
 Ágnes Litter (born 1975), Hungarian alpine skier
 Ágnes Lukács (1920–2016), Hungarian-Jewish painter, graphic artist, and school teacher
 Ágnes Miskó (born 1971), Hungarian gymnast
 Ágnes Mócsy, Romanian physicist
 Ágnes Molnár (born 1956), Hungarian politician
 Ágnes Mutina (born 1988), Hungarian swimmer
 Ágnes Nagy (born 1992), Hungarian footballer
 Ágnes Nemes Nagy (1922–1991), Hungarian poet, writer, educator, and translator
 Ágnes Németh (born 1961), Hungarian basketball player
 Ágnes Osztolykán (born 1974), Hungarian politician and activist
 Ágnes Pallag (born 1993), Hungarian volleyball player
 Ágnes Pozsonyi, Hungarian sprint canoer
 Ágnes Primász (born 1980), Hungarian water polo player
 Ágnes Rapai (born 1952), Hungarian poet, writer, and translator
 Ágnes Ságvári (1928–2000), Hungarian historian
 Ágnes Simon (born 1974), Romanian cross-country skier
 Ágnes Simor (born 1979), Hungarian actress and dancer
 Ágnes Sipka (born 1954), Hungarian long-distance runner
 Ágnes Studer (born 1998), Hungarian basketball player
 Ágnes Sütő (born 1992), Icelandic gymnast and coach
 Ágnes Szatmári (born 1987), Romanian tennis player
 Ágnes Szávay (born 1988), Hungarian tennis player
 Ágnes Szendrei, Hungarian-American mathematician
 Ágnes Szentannai (born 1994), Hungarian curler
 Ágnes Szijj (born 1956), Hungarian rower
 Ágnes Szilágyi (born 1990), Hungarian handball player
 Ágnes Szokolszky (born 1956), Hungarian educator and psychologist
 Ágnes Torma (born 1951), Hungarian volleyball player
 Ágnes Triffa (born 1987), Hungarian handball goalkeeper
 Ágnes Vadai (born 1974), Hungarian politician and scholar
 Ágnes Valkai (born 1981), Hungarian water polo player
 Ágnes Huszár Várdy (died 2022), Hungarian writer
 Ágnes Végh (born 1939), Hungarian handball player

Agnès
 Agnès Acker (born 1940), French astrophysicist and professor
 Agnès Agboton (born 1960), Beninese writer, poet, storyteller, and translator
 Agnès Arnauld (1593–1672), abbess of Port-Royal and major figure in French Jansenism
 Agnès Barthélémy, French physicist
 Agnès Bénassy-Quéré (born 1966), French economist
 Agnès Bernet (born 1968), French cell biologist and professor
 Agnès Bihl, French singer
 Agnès Buzyn (born 1962), French hematologist, professor, medical practitioner, and politician
 Agnès Cabrol (1964–2007), French Egyptologist
 Agnès Callamard (born 1965), French human rights expert and Secretary General of Amnesty International
 Agnès Chiquet (born 1984), French weightlifter
 Agnès Clancier (born 1963), French writer
 Agnès de La Barre de Nanteuil (1922–1944), French Resistance worker
 Agnès Delahaie (1920–2003), French film producer
 Agnès Desarthe (born 1966), French novelist, children's writer, and translator
 Agnès Evren (born 1970), French politician
 Agnès Fienga, French astronomer
 Agnès Firmin-Le Bodo (born 1968), French politician
 Agnès Godard (born 1951), César Award-winning French cinematographer
 Agnès Gosselin (born 1967), French figure skater
 Agnès Grondin, Canadian politician
 Agnès Gruda, Polish-Canadian journalist and fiction writer
 Agnès Henry-Hocquard (born 1962), French winemaker
 Agnès Humbert (1894–1963), art historian, ethnographer and member of the French Resistance during World War II
 Agnès Jaoui (born 1964), French screenwriter, film director, actress and singer
 Agnès Kraidy (born 1965), Ivorian magazine editor and journalist
 Agnès Lacheux (born 1974), French Paracanoeist
 Agnès Laurent (1936–2010), French actress
 Agnès Le Brun (born 1961), French politician
 Agnès Le Lannic, French table tennis player
 Agnès Lefort (1891–1973), Canadian artist, educator, and gallery owner
 Agnès Letestu (born 1971), French ballet dancer
 Agnès Maltais (born 1956), Canadian politician
 Agnès Marin (1997–2011), French murder victim 
 Agnès Martin-Lugand (born 1979), French novelist 
 Agnès Matoko, Romanian model 
 Agnès Mellon (born 1958), French soprano
 Agnès Mercier, French curler and coach
 Agnès Merlet (born 1959), French film director
 Agnès Nkada (born 1995), Cameroonian footballer
 Agnès Ntamabyaliro Rutagwera (born 1937), Rwandan politician
 Agnès Pannier-Runacher (born 1974), French businesswoman and politician
 Agnès Poirier (born 1975), French journalist, writer, and broadcaster
 Agnès Raharolahy (born 1992), French sprinter
 Agnès Rosenstiehl (born 1941), French author and illustrator
 Agnès Soral (born 1960), Franco-Swiss actress, comedian, and writer
 Agnès Sorel (1421–1450), favorite mistress of King Charles VII of France
 Agnès Souret (1902–1928), French-Basque actress
 Agnès Spaak (born 1944), French-Belgian actress and photographer
 Agnès Sulem (born 1959), French mathematician
 Agnès Tchuinté (1959–1990), Cameroonian javelin thrower
 Agnès Teppe (born 1968), French discus thrower
 Agnès Thill (born 1964), French politician
 Agnès Thurnauer (born 1962), French-Swiss artist
  Agnès Troublé (born 1941), French fashion designer Agnès b.
 Agnès Varda (1928–2019), French movie director
 Agnès Vesterman, French classical cellist
 Agnès Zugasti (born 1972), French tennis player

Agness
Agness Gidna, Tanzanian paleontologist
Agness Musase (born 1997), Zambian footballer 
Agness Underwood (1902–1984), American journalist and newspaper editor

See also
 
 Juana Inés de la Cruz (Iohanna Agnes of the Cross), scholar, poet, nun and a writer

References

Danish feminine given names
Agnes
Estonian feminine given names
Filipino feminine given names
Finnish feminine given names
French feminine given names
German feminine given names
Greek feminine given names
Given names of Greek language origin
Hungarian feminine given names
Icelandic feminine given names
Norwegian feminine given names
Scandinavian feminine given names
Swedish feminine given names

sl:Neža
fr:Agnès (prénom)